The Veduga is a right tributary of the river Don, flowing through the northwestern corner of Voronezh Oblast in Russia. There are settlements almost continuously along its banks; the nearest large town is Semiluki.

References

Rivers of Voronezh Oblast